More Than Us EP is an extended play by Scottish rock band Travis, released in 1998. It became the group's first UK Singles Chart top 20 hit. The tracks "More Than Us", "All I Want to Do Is Rock" and "Funny Thing" are from the band's 1997 debut album Good Feeling.  "More Than Us" is known for being the song that influenced their mainstream breakthrough. Both physical releases featured three previously unreleased recordings; the John Lennon cover "Give Me Some Truth", "Beautiful Bird" and "Reason". The EP's artwork, which depicts a rear view of four chairs behind a table, is strikingly similar to the cover for the band's 2000 single, "Coming Around".

Track listing
 UK CD1 / 7" vinyl / cassette
 "More Than Us" (Single Version) (featuring Anne Dudley) - 3:59
 "Give Me Some Truth"  - 3:16
 "All I Want to Do Is Rock" (Live Version) (featuring Noel Gallagher) - 4:50
 "Funny Thing" (Alternative Version) (featuring Tim Simenon) - 3:44

 UK CD2
 "More Than Us" (Single Version) (featuring Anne Dudley) - 3:59
 "Beautiful Bird" (Demo) - 6:39
 "Reason" (featuring Susie Hug) - 3:29
 "More Than Us" (Acoustic Version) - 4:50

References

1998 debut EPs
Travis (band) albums
Albums produced by Steve Lillywhite